The 2011 Gedling Borough Council election took place on 5 May 2011 to elect members of Gedling Borough Council in Nottinghamshire, England. The whole council was up for election and the Labour Party gained overall control of the council from the Conservative Party.

Campaign
Before the election the Conservatives ran the council with 28 seats, compared to 9 for Labour, 8 Liberal Democrats and 5 independents.

A big issue in the election was the introduction of car parking charges by the Conservative council. Labour said that local businesses were suffering because of the charges and proposed to end the charges and cut the number of councillors, while the Conservatives said the charges enabled them to preserve services and keep council tax down. Meanwhile, the Liberal Democrats expected that they and the Conservatives would suffer due to the cuts being made by the national coalition government.

Election result
The results saw Labour gain control of the council from the Conservatives, after taking 13 seats from the Conservative party, 5 from the Liberal Democrats and all 5 independent seats. This left Labour with 32 seats, compared to 15 Conservatives and 3 Liberal Democrats. Overall turnout in the election was 45.3%.

Ward results

Bestwood Village

Bonington

Burton Joyce and Stoke Bardolph

Calverton

Carlton

Carlton Hill

Daybrook

Gedling

Killisick

Kingswell

Lambley

Mapperley Plains

Netherfield and Colwick

Newstead

Phoenix

Porchester

Ravenshead

St James

St Mary's

Valley

Woodborough

Woodthorpe

By-Elections between May 2011 - April 2015

By-elections are called when a representative Councillor resigns or dies, so are unpredictable.  A by-election is held to fill a political office that has become vacant between the scheduled elections.

Phoenix - 15 September 2011

Kingswell - 2 May 2013

Gedling - 27 March 2014

References

2011 English local elections
2011
2010s in Nottinghamshire